Lohrasb (also Romanized as Lohrāsb; also known as Lohrāsbeh and Lohrāsbīyeh) is a village in Ahmadabad Rural District, in the Central District of Firuzabad County, Fars Province, Iran. At the 2006 census, its population was 339, in 84 families.

References 

Populated places in Firuzabad County